The Norfolk Wildlife Trust (NWT) is one of 46 wildlife trusts covering Great Britain, Northern Ireland, Isle of Man and Alderney. Founded in 1926, it is the oldest of all the trusts. It has over 35,500 members and eight local groups and it manages more than fifty nature reserves and other protected sites. It also gives conservation advice to individuals and organisations, provides educational services to young people on field trips and organises entertainment and information events at nature reserves. The NWT reserves include twenty-six Sites of Special Scientific Interests, nine national nature reserves, twelve Nature Conservation Review sites, sixteen Special Areas of Conservation, twelve Special Protection Areas, eleven Ramsar sites, two local nature reserves, four Geological Conservation Review sites and five which are in Areas of Outstanding Natural Beauty.

Norfolk is a county in East Anglia. The top level of local government is Norfolk County Council with seven second tier councils: Breckland District Council, Broadland District Council, Great Yarmouth Borough Council, King's Lynn and West Norfolk Borough Council, North Norfolk District Council, Norwich City Council and South Norfolk District Council. The county is bounded by Cambridgeshire, Suffolk, Lincolnshire and the North Sea.

Key

Public access
FEE = Fee charged for access
FP = public access to footpaths through the site
PL = public access at limited times
YES = public access to the whole or most of the site

Other classifications
AONB = Area of Outstanding Natural Beauty
GCR = Geological Conservation Review

LNR = Local nature reserve
NCR = Nature Conservation Review
NNR = National nature reserve
Ramsar = Ramsar site, an internationally important wetland site
SAC = Special Area of Conservation
SPA = Special Protection Area under the European Union Directive on the Conservation of Wild Birds
SSSI = Site of Special Scientific Interest

Sites

See also
List of Local Nature Reserves in Norfolk
List of Sites of Special Scientific Interest in Norfolk

Notes

References

Sources

External links
Norfolk Wildlife Trust website

 
Charities based in Norfolk
Wildlife Trusts of England
1926 establishments in England
Organizations established in 1926